Pippin Parker (born June 22, 1969, in Syracuse, New York) is an American playwright and theatre director. He is Dean of The New School for Drama.

Career
Parker is an American playwright and director. He is the former Dean of the School of Writing, Acting, and Directing program at The New School. He is one of the co-founding members of Naked Angels, a theater company in New York City where he was Artistic Director. Along with Nicole Burdette, Frank Pugliese and Kenneth Lonergan, he is a member of a writer's group for dramatic and fiction authors.

His short play A Gift was produced in New York and Los Angeles and a later radio adaptation was featured on NPR’s The Next Big Thing.  Naked Angels and New York Stage and Film have both produced his play Assisted Living.

His television work includes writing episodes of the animated series The Tick and Doug, as well as the CTW educational music show for children, Jam Inn.

He directed the production of George Packer's first play Betrayed at The Culture Project, New York which won the 2008 Lucille Lortel Award for Outstanding Play.

Parker is active in the Writers Guild of America, East.

Stage plays

As playwright 
 1994 - Limbo, The Coast Playhouse, Los Angeles, performed by Naked Angels, directed by Kate Baggot
 1996 - A Gift, Theater 3, New York
 1997 - Passion Play, produced in Winter Shorts, Actors' Gang Theater, Hollywood, performed by Naked Angels
 1998 - Anesthesia, New York Performance Works, Manhattan, directed by Lori Steinberg
 1998 - Little Bites, Tiffany Theater, West Hollywood, performed by Naked Angels, directed by Josh Hamilton
 2007 - Ever Less Free, directed by Frank Pugliese

As director 
 2004 - The Democracy Project, series of new one-act plays, The Culture Project, New York
 2008 - Betrayed, by George Packer, The Culture Project, New York
 2010 - A Long and Happy Life, by Bekah Brunstetter, Susan Stein Shiva Theater, Vassar College, Poughkeepsie
 2011 - Knickerbocker, by Jonathan Marc Sherman, Public Theater, New York

Personal life
He is the younger brother of Sarah Jessica Parker and Toby Parker.

References

External links

Place of birth missing (living people)
1969 births
Living people
American dramatists and playwrights
American theatre directors
Jewish American dramatists and playwrights
The New School faculty
Screenwriters from New York (state)
21st-century American Jews